The 2011 Bet-at-home Cup Kitzbühel was a men's tennis tournament played on outdoor clay courts. It was the 67th edition of the Austrian Open Kitzbühel, as part of the ATP World Tour 250 series of the 2011 ATP World Tour. It took place at the Tennis stadium Kitzbühel in Kitzbuehel Austria, from August 1 through 7, 2011. It was demoted to the ATP Challenger in 2010, made its return to the ATP World Tour in 2011.

ATP entrants

Seeds

*Seedings based on the July 25, 2011 rankings.

Other entrants
The following players received wildcards into the singles main draw:
  Dominic Thiem
  Thomas Muster
  Javier Martí

The following players received entry from the qualifying draw:

  Daniel Brands
  Jerzy Janowicz
  João Souza
  Antonio Veić

Champions

Singles

 Robin Haase defeated  Albert Montañés, 6–4, 4–6, 6–1
 It's the first title of the career for the Dutch player.

Doubles

 Daniele Bracciali /  Santiago González defeated  Franco Ferreiro /  André Sá, 7–6(7–1), 4–6, [11–9]

References

External links
Official website

Bet-at-home Cup Kitzbuhel
Austrian Open Kitzbühel
2011 in Austrian tennis